The Carlos Palanca Memorial Awards for Literature winners for 2010 (rank, name of author, title of winning entry (italicized, in parentheses)). The awarding ceremonies were held on September 1, 2010, at the Peninsula Hotel Manila in Makati.

Filipino division

Dulang Pampelikula
1st – Kristoffer G. Brugada (Patikul)
2nd – Jerry B. Gracio (Magdamag)
3rd – No Winner

Dulang Ganap ang Haba
1st – No Winner
2nd – Liza C. Magtoto (Rated PG)
3rd – Christian R. Vallez (Kapeng Barako Club: Samahan ng mga Bitter)

Dulang May Isang Yugto
1st – Nicolas B. Pichay (Isang Araw sa Karnabal)
2nd – Floy C. Quintos (Suor Clara)
3rd – Allan B. Lopez (Higit Pa Dito)

Kabataan sanaysay
1st – Christopher S. Rosales (Gulayan Klasrum)
2nd – Marianito L. Dio Jr. (Ang Aking Pangalan, Ang Aking Kababata at ang Mithing Tilamsik para kay Third)
3rd – No Winner

Tula
1st – Carlos M. Piocos III (Guerra Cantos)
2nd - Romulo P. Baquiran Jr. (Parokya)
3rd – Mark Anthony S. Angeles (Engkantado)

Tulang Pambata
1st – No Winner
2nd – No Winner
3rd – Will P. Ortiz (May Puso Ang Saging)

Maikling Kwento
1st – No Winner
2nd – Rommel B. Rodriguez (Toxic)
3rd – Thomas David F. Chavez (Sa Kabilang Lupalop ng Mahiwagang Kaharian)

Maikling Kwentong Pambata
1st – Christopher S. Rosales (Si Berting, ang Batang Uling)
2nd – Renerio R. Concepcion (Ang Kagilagilalas na Paglalakbay nina Mumo at Am-I)
3rd – Bernadette V. Neri (Parada ng mga Alingawngaw)

Sanaysay
1st – Maria Clarissa N. Estuar (Ang Reyna ng mga Tumbong)
2nd – Ferdinand P. Jarin (D’Pol Pisigan Band)
3rd – Mark Gil M. Caparros (Sina Bunso at ang mga Batang Preso)

Regional languages division

Short story – Iloko
1st – Sherma E. Benosa (Dagiti Pasugnod ni Angelo)
2nd – Ariel S. Tabag (Voice Tape)
3rd – Joel B. Manuel (Apo Bannual! Apo Bannual!)

Short story – Cebuano
1st – Richel G. Dorotan (Si Tarzan)
2nd - Jonecito R. Saguban (Tinuboang Sapatos)
3rd – Noel P. Tuazon (Patas)

Short story – Hiligaynon
1st – Andy P. Perez (Bayuso)
2nd – Ferdinand L. Balino (Dumdumon Ko Ang Imo Guya)
3rd – Jesus C. Insilada, Ed. D. (Walingwaling)

English division

Full-length play
1st – Jay Crisostomo IV (God of the Machine)
2nd – Jorshinelle Taleon-Sonza (The Encounter)
3rd – Lito Casaje (Shooting the Boys)

One-act play
1st – No Winner
2nd – No Winner
3rd – Peter Solis Nery (The Wide Ionian Sea)

Short story
1st – Ma. Elena L. Paulma (Three Kisses)
2nd – Ma. Rachelle Tesoro (Waiting for Rain)
3rd – Catherine Rose Galang Torres (Café Masala)

Short story for children
1st – Irene Carolina A. Sarmiento (Tabon Girl)
2nd – Hiyasmin Ledi C. Mattison (Little Bear Goes Home: A Love Story)
3rd – Grace D. Chong (I am an Apple)

Poetry
1st – Merlie M. Alunan (Tales of the Spiderwoman)
2nd - Rafael Antonio C. San Diego (My Name in Reverse)
3rd – Joel H. Vega (Latitudes and Other Poems)

Poetry for children
1st – Duffie Alejandrino H. Osental (After the Storm and Other Poems)
2nd – Patricia Marie Grace S. Gomez (Poems from the Pantry and Prehistoric Times)
3rd – Ma. Celine Anastasia P. Socrates (Playgrounds)

Essay
1st – Miro Frances D. Capili (Vinyl)
2nd – Florianne Marie L. Jimenez (Postcards from Somewhere)
3rd – Corinna Esperanza A. Nuqui (Library)

Kabataan essay
1st – Miro Frances D. Capili (The Nature of Nurture)
2nd - Anton Raphael S. Cabalza (A Shot at Perfection)
3rd - Catherine D. Tan, (Green at Heart)

References

Palanca Awards
Palanca Awards, 2010